Frank Patrick Slavin (5 January 1862 – 17 October 1929), also known as "Paddy" Slavin, was an Australian heavyweight boxer. He was a pioneer of prizefighting in his country, fighting under the tutelage of Larry Foley.

One of Slavin's first bouts was against Bob Fitzsimmons, who later became the world's first triple champion. Slavin established himself as one of the best heavyweights of his time by defeating then unbeaten New Zealand champion Harry Laing and eventually capturing the Australian heavyweight championship. In 1890, Slavin was named the world heavyweight champion by the National Police Gazette. John L. Sullivan was commonly regarded as the titleholder, but the Gazette declared Slavin the world champion in light of Sullivan's reluctance to fight challengers. He also engaged in a close rivalry with Peter Jackson. The feud, which had started a decade earlier, was resolved in a closely contested fight for the first Commonwealth heavyweight title won by Jackson in May 1892.

Slavin moved to the Yukon during the Klondike Gold Rush. He died in Vancouver at the age of 67. Slavin was inducted to the Australian National Boxing Hall of Fame in 2005.

References

1862 births
1929 deaths
Australian male boxers
People of the Klondike Gold Rush
Heavyweight boxers